São Tiago is a Brazilian municipality in the state of Minas Gerais. As of 2020 its population is estimated to be 10,960.

Geography 
The municipality belongs to the Immediate Geographic Region of São João del-Rei, in the Intermediate Geographic Region of Barbacena.

The municipality is part of the Roman Catholic Diocese of Oliveira.

References

Municipalities in Minas Gerais